Matos or Mattos, sometimes de Matos or de Mattos, is a  Sephardic and Portuguese language surname.

The origin of the surname Matos or Mattos is toponymic. It was taken from a place with this designation, in the region of Lamego in Portugal. It originates in Egas Hermigues, great-grandson of King Ramiro II, from the Kingdom of León. Egas was of great valour and had the nickname of the "Bravo." He founded the convent of Freixo and made Mattos Farmhouse. His son and heir Hermandio Pais de Mattos followed the lineage. There are documents of Paio Hermigues de Mattos, contemporary of Kings  Sancho II and Alfonso III of Portugal. Hermigio de Mattos was the owner of that farm and had others for honor. It is also a surname used by many Sephardic Jewish and converso families. "Matos" is a word in Hebrew that means "tribes", or in the more literal form, "wooden sticks". Francisca Nuñez de Carabajal, a Crypto-Jewish burned at stake in Mexico City by the Holy Office was condemned along her Crypto-Jewish husband, Francisco Rodríguez de Matos.

It may refer to:

In media and entertainment
 Alexander Teixeira de Mattos (1865–1921), journalist, literary critic and publisher
 Andre Matos (1972–2019), a Brazilian musician
 André Mattos (born 1961), Brazilian actor
 Francisco Vieira de Matos, known as "Vieira Lusitano" (1699-1783), royal painter to King John V of Portugal
 Gerardo Matos Rodríguez, a Uruguayan composer
 Gregório de Mattos (1636–1696), Brazilian writer
 Luis Palés Matos (1898-1959), a poet from Puerto Rico
 Mayra Matos (born 1988), Miss Puerto Rico Universe 2009
 Monica Mattos (born 1984), Brazilian pornographic actress

In sport

Football (soccer)
 Diogo Matos, (born 1975), Portuguese footballer
 Marcelo Mattos (born 1984), Brazilian football midfielder
 Marcelo Mendonça de Mattos, (born 1984), Brazilian football midfielder
 Marcelo Roberto Lima de Mattos (born 1986), Brazilian football midfielder
 Marco Antonio de Mattos Filho (born 1986), Brazilian football midfielder
 Marcos Renan de Mattos Ceschin (born 1985), Brazilian football midfielder

Other sports
 Agberto Matos (born 1972), Brazilian Olympic handball player
 Ángel Matos, a Cuban taekwondo athlete
 Grant Mattos (born 1981), National Football League wide receiver
 Harry Mattos (1911–1992), American football player
 Ian Matos (born 1989),  Brazilian diver
 Julius Matos (born 1974), American baseball player
 Luis Matos (born 1978), Puertorican baseball player
 Rafael Matos (born 1996), Brazilian tennis player

In other fields
 Dina Matos McGreevey (born 1966), former First Lady of New Jersey
 Huber Matos (1918–2014), a Cuban dissident
 Sabina Matos, American politician
  (1832-1885), founder of the 
 José Norton de Matos (1867-1955), a general and a Portuguese politician
 Manuel Vieira de Matos (1861–1932), archbishop of Braga, Portugal
 Roy Chaderton Matos (1942- ), a Venezuelan diplomat

See also 
 Matos (disambiguation)

Portuguese-language surnames